AbsoluteTelnet is a software terminal client for Windows that implements Telnet, SSH 1 and 2, SFTP, TAPI Dialup and direct COM port connections.  It is commercial software, originally released in 1999 and is still in regular development by Brian Pence of Celestial Software.

Features
Some features of AbsoluteTelnet:
Emulates VT52, VT100, VT220, VT320, ANSI, Xterm, QNX, SCO-ANSI, ANSIBBS, and WYSE60
Password, Public-key, keyboard-interactive, Smartcard and GSSAPI authentication support
Support Triple DES, TWOFISH, BLOWFISH, AES, ARCFOUR, CAST128 ciphers
Tabbed interface for multiple concurrent connections (Dockable)
Scripting support using VBScript
Unicode 5.0 support, including bidirectional text, surrogates, combining characters, etc...
Passthru printing
IPv6 support.
IDNA support
Localized into 8 languages (English, German, French, Portuguese, Chinese, Russian, Norwegian and Hungarian)
Pocket PC support
XMODEM, YMODEM, and ZMODEM file transfer for all terminal connections
SSH File Transfer Protocol for ssh2 connections only

See also

Comparison of SSH clients

References

Further reading
 Centrify article on Single Sign On with Absolutetelnet

External links
 Official AbsoluteTelnet website
 Mailing list

Cryptographic software
Internet Protocol based network software
Telnet
Terminal emulators